Chiara Zeffirelli (born 16 July 1976, in Avignon) is a French classical crossover soprano.

She performed the role of Aïra, the betrayed princess of the post-modern opera "Atylantos" by Jean-Patrick Capdevielle.

Recently she had some performances in Mexico City and Pachuca de Soto with the Mexican Crossover tenor Oscar Aguilar.

Discography

Albums
Atylantos written and produced by Jean-Patrick Capdevielle and featuring Chiara Zeffirelli, Elena Cojocaru, Jade Laura d'Angelis, and Nikola Todorovich.(Album, 2001, Pendragon Records/Universal Music Group)

Other releases
Spente le Stelle (Opera Trance) - The Remixes - Part One (Remix album, 2000, Radikal Records)
Pasión por la Luna (Compilation album, 2010, EMI)

References

External links
 Atylantos Review in English
 Atylantos Review in French
 Jean Patrick Capdevielle Interview in French
 Last.fm Profile in Spanish
 Discogs Profile (Incompleted)
 Article of Chiara Zeffirelli and Oscar Aguilar

Opera crossover singers
French operatic sopranos
1976 births
Living people
21st-century French singers
21st-century French women singers